Tweener may refer to:

In sports:
 A shot in racket sports that is performed by hitting the ball between the legs:
 Tweener (tennis)
 Tweener (pickleball)
 Tweener, a basketball player able to play two different positions
 Tweener, a professional wrestler portrayed as morally neutral or ambiguous
 Tweener, a bowler whose bowling form falls between accurate stroking and powerful cranking
 Tweener racket, a mid-size, mid-weight tennis racket for intermediate players

Other:
 Tweener (age group)
 "Tweener", the 9th episode from season 1 of Prison Break
 David "Tweener" Apolskis, a character from the U.S. television series Prison Break

See also
Tween (disambiguation)
Inbetweening